The 1998 Copa Merconorte was an association football tournament held in 1998. Atlético Nacional of Colombia beat Deportivo Cali also of Colombia in the final.

Originally, this tournament was to start on 1 September 1998 (the group stage lasting until 25 November), with 16 teams divided into 4 groups of 4. Those 16 teams included 3 Mexican teams, América, Cruz Azul and Guadalajara.

However, the Mexican Football Federation insisted on including Toluca and Necaxa, the two finalists of the 1998 Summer season, instead of América and Guadalajara, who had been chosen for their popular support. No agreement could be reached, and on 20 August the Mexican teams withdrew. The organization then decided to remove the two teams from the USA (D.C. United and Los Angeles Galaxy) as well, include a fourth Colombian team (América de Cali) and play with 3 groups of 4.

Group stage
Each team played the other teams in the group twice during the group stage. The three group winners and the best runner-up advanced to the second round.

Group A

Group B

Group C

Ranking of second placed teams

Semifinals

First Leg

Second Leg

Finals

First Leg

Second Leg

Champion

References

External links
 1998 Copa Merconorte game summaries
 1998 Copa Merconorte stats

Copa Merconorte
3